Wang Yeu-tzuoo , who also goes by Jimmy Wang, (born February 8, 1985) is a professional tennis player from Taiwan. Until the emergence of Lu Yen-hsun, Wang was the highest ranked player from Taiwan. The right-hander stands 5 feet 10 inches and weighs 141 pounds. Wang's trademark look is his wearing a white baseball cap backwards.

Tennis career

Juniors
Wang started playing tennis at age seven and quickly emerged as one of Asia's most highly touted junior players. He made the final of the 2001 Australian Open Boys' Singles (losing to Janko Tipsarević) and the final of the US Open Boys' Singles (losing to Gilles Müller).

As a junior, he compiled a 136–52 win–loss record in singles (and 78-57 in doubles), reaching as high as No. 3 in the world junior singles rankings in April 2001 (and No. 8 in doubles).

Junior Slam results - Singles:

Australian Open: F (2001)
French Open: 1R (2000, 2001)
Wimbledon: SF (2001)
US Open: F (2001)

Pro tour
Wang turned pro in 2003 and has improved his game and ranking year each he has been on the professional circuit. In 2005, Wang broke into the ATP Top 100 for the first time by virtue of three straight Challenger final appearances, winning a title at Istanbul, Turkey. The 21-year-old also reached the quarterfinal round of the ATP event in Bangkok, Thailand, and lost to Rafael Nadal in the 1st round in Beijing, China at the China Open. Wang made his Grand Slam debut at Wimbledon in 2004, losing to Andy Roddick in the first round. In 2006, he reached the second round, bowing out to James Blake 3 sets to 1.

Wang's best Grand Slam performance to date came at Wimbledon in 2014, where he defeated Alejandro González and Mikhail Youzhny to advance to the third round, ultimately losing to Jo-Wilfried Tsonga.

Yeu-Tzuoo is a member of the Chinese Taipei Davis Cup team, compiling an impressive 17–6 record in Davis Cup action since 2001. His coach is Serb Dejan Petrović.

Junior Grand Slam finals

Singles: 2 (2 runners-up)

Performance timeline

Singles

ATP Challenger and ITF Futures finals

Singles: 29 (13–16)

Doubles: 16 (6–10)

External links
 
 
 
 Wang recent match results
 Wang world ranking history

1985 births
Living people
Taiwanese male tennis players
Asian Games medalists in tennis
Tennis players at the 2002 Asian Games
Tennis players at the 2006 Asian Games
Tennis players at the 2014 Asian Games
Asian Games bronze medalists for Chinese Taipei
Medalists at the 2006 Asian Games
Universiade medalists in tennis
Universiade bronze medalists for Chinese Taipei